Borrowed Time may refer to:

Music 
 Borrowed Time (Diamond Head album), 1982
 Borrowed Time (Frontline album), 2005
 "Borrowed Time" (John Lennon song), 1984
 "Borrowed Time" (Styx song), 1979
 "Borrowed Time", song by AC/DC, a B-side of the single "Moneytalks"
 "Borrowed Time", song by Nicole from Make It Hot

Other media 
 "Borrowed Time" (Dark Angel), an episode of the television series Dark Angel
 Borrowed Time (video game), a 1985 adventure game
 Borrowed Time (film), a 2016 short film directed by Pixar artist Andrew Coats and Lou Hamou-Lhadj

See also
 On Borrowed Time, a 1939 film starring Lionel Barrymore
 On Borrowed Time, a 1937 novel by Lawrence Edward Watkin, basis for the film